Greatest Hits is the debut album by grime artist Skepta, released on 17 September 2007, by Boy Better Know.

Track listing

Notes
 Track: 15 "Single (Remix)" is only available on the CD version of the album.

References
Skepta's year in grime, 2015 following on from the Greatest Hits album - Year of Grime.

External links
 

2007 debut albums
Skepta albums